Christopher Mary Kuggeleijn (born 10 May 1956) is a retired former New Zealand cricketer. He played two Test matches in 1988–89 and 16 One Day Internationals for New Zealand in 1988 and 1989. He played domestic cricket for Northern Districts and also played for Hamilton in the Hawke Cup.

Kuggeleijn is of Dutch extraction, which accounts for his unusual middle name of Mary. Kuggeleijn's son Scott also plays for New Zealand, as well as Northern Districts in the Plunket Shield.

International career
His biggest contribution came in just the third over of his Test debut at Bangalore, when he took the catch (India's Arun Lal) that gave Richard Hadlee the record number of Test wickets (374) at the time.

After cricket
He later coached Northern Districts and the Hamilton Boys' High School 1st XI which, under his tutelage was national champion twice.

References

1956 births
Living people
New Zealand One Day International cricketers
New Zealand Test cricketers
New Zealand cricketers
Northern Districts cricketers
New Zealand people of Dutch descent
New Zealand cricket coaches